The McDonough County Voice is a daily newspaper published in Macomb, Illinois, United States. It is owned by Gannett.

External links 
 

Gannett publications
Newspapers published in Illinois
Macomb, Illinois
McDonough County, Illinois